Luca Palesi (born 17 February 1997) is an Italian professional footballer who plays as a midfielder for  club Olbia.

Club career
On 31 January 2019, he joined Giana Erminio on loan from Monza. On 16 July 2019, he was loaned to Pro Patria. Palesi joined Pro Sesto on 13 August 2020 on a permanent deal.

On 17 July 2021, he signed a two-year contract with Olbia. On 18 January 2022, he joined Ancona-Matelica on loan.

Honours

Club 
Monza
 Serie D: 2016–17
 Scudetto Dilettanti: 2016–17

References

1997 births
Footballers from Milan
Living people
Italian footballers
Association football midfielders
A.C. Monza players
A.S. Giana Erminio players
Aurora Pro Patria 1919 players
S.S.D. Pro Sesto players
Olbia Calcio 1905 players
Ancona-Matelica players
Serie C players
Serie D players